The Rwanda Basketball League Division 2 is the second-highest men's basketball competition in Rwanda, after the Rwanda Basketball League (RBL). On December 1, 2021, the FERWABA announced the creation of the new competition. Its inaugural season began on April 1, 2022, with 16 teams divided in three groups.

The champions and runners-up of the league are promoted to the Rwanda Basketball League for the following season.

Teams
The following 16 teams played in the 2021–22 season.

Champions

Pre-season tournament

Champions

References

2
Basketball leagues in Africa